All Together Now is a 2020 American drama film directed by Brett Haley, from a screenplay by Haley, Marc Basch, Matthew Quick and Ol Parker. It is based upon the novel Sorta Like a Rockstar by Quick. It stars Auliʻi Cravalho, Justina Machado, Fred Armisen, Carol Burnett, Judy Reyes, Taylor Richardson, Rhenzy Feliz, Gerald Isaac Waters and Anthony Jacques.

It was released on August 28, 2020, by Netflix.

Plot 

Amber Appleton is in high school in Portland, Oregon with her mother Becky. They are temporarily homeless after Becky leaves her abusive boyfriend Oliver, sleeping in the school bus Becky drives.

Amber is very busy, including teaching an ESL class and working in an old age home, where she has bonded with Joan, a resident. She also plans an annual school variety show, the proceeds going to charity. Amber is invited to audition for the drama program at Carnegie Mellon University, her deceased father's alma mater. At Becky's encouragement, she spends rent money for a plane ticket. Becky is fired when it's discovered that they have been living in the bus. She decides to return to Oliver, but Amber refuses to join her, sleeping on a park bench and subsequently getting robbed.

She confides about her situation in her friend Ty, who takes Amber to his family's vacation house to stay and help her prepare for her audition. She tells him that her father's death caused her mother to struggle and for them to be evicted and move in with Oliver, who eventually became abusive. Becky, who is an alcoholic, frequently suffers relapses while with Oliver. With the help of Donna, the mother of her friend Ricky, Amber tells Becky that she does not feel safe living with Oliver. They have an argument, and Becky leaves; Amber stays at Donna's house. The following morning, Amber meets with police officers at school, who inform her that her mother and Oliver have been killed in a drunk driving car accident.

On the day of her audition, Amber discovers that her dog Bobby is sick; she misses her plane flight to her audition, to take him to the vet, where she learns he requires expensive surgery. She drops out and begins working full-time in order to afford the surgery, forgoing a rescheduled audition and losing contact with her friends. Ty confronts her and accuses her of rejecting help from others, and the two stop speaking.

She plans to skip the variety show, but Ty surprises her at work, revealing that the proceeds will go towards paying for the dog's surgery. All of Amber's friends perform in the show, including the students from her ESL class. At the end of the evening, the fundraiser is still $2,000 short, but suddenly receives an anonymous donation of $200,000. At the home, Joan reveals that she is the one who made the donation, as she considers her as family. Amber gets another audition from Carnegie Mellon, and she and Ty share a kiss before she leaves.

Cast
 Auliʻi Cravalho as Amber Appleton
 Rhenzy Feliz as Ty
 Judy Reyes as Donna
 Justina Machado as Becky Appleton
 Taylor Richardson as Jordan
 C.S. Lee as Father Chee
 Anthony Jacques Jr. as Ricky
 Gerald Isaac Waters as Chad
 Fred Armisen as Mr. Franks
 Carol Burnett as Joan
 Ryley Martin as Tommy
 Tin-Tin as Bobby Big Boy

Production

Development
In August 2013, Fox Searchlight Pictures acquired screen rights to Sorta Like a Rock Star by Matthew Quick, and would produce and finance the film, with Temple Hill Entertainment and Gotham Group producing, with Laura Sandler and Amanda Harlib writing the film. In March 2016, it was announced Miguel Arteta would direct the film, with Ol Parker writing the script. In July 2017, it was announced Bryce Dallas Howard would direct the film, replacing Arteta and Fox Searchlight Pictures no longer involved. In November 2017, Netflix acquired distribution rights to the film, with Quick writing the screenplay.

Casting
In July 2019, Auliʻi Cravalho joined the cast of the film, with Brett Haley replacing Dallas Howard who departed due to scheduling conflicts. In September 2019, Carol Burnett, Fred Armisen, Rhenzy Feliz, Justina Machado, Judy Reyes, Gerald Isaac Waters, Taylor Richardson, and Anthony Jacques had joined the cast of the film.

Filming
Principal photography began in October 2019 in Portland, Oregon. Neighborhoods in northeast Portland have been used to film. Some of the homes used for filming were in the same neighborhoods as those featured in Fred Armisen's work, Portlandia.

Release
All Together Now was released on August 28, 2020.

Critical reception
The website's critics consensus reads: "Elevated by Auli'i Cravalho's charming performance, All Together Now is an uplifting drama that stays largely on the right side of the line between sweet and cloying." On Metacritic, the film has a weighted average score of 64 out of 100, based on 11 critics, indicating "generally favorable reviews".

References

External links
 

2020 drama films
2020 films
American drama films
Films about homelessness
Films about poverty in the United States
Films based on American novels
Films based on young adult literature
Films directed by Brett Haley
Films scored by Keegan DeWitt
Films set in Portland, Oregon
Films shot in Portland, Oregon
English-language Netflix original films
2020s English-language films
2020s American films